Joe Lynn was a Tony Award winning American theatrical Property master who worked primarily on Broadway. He is best known for creating the properties on the original Broadway productions such as Death of a Salesman and Cat on a Hot Tin Roof. He began his career in props in 1915.

Awards
In 1949, Lynn received the Tony Award for Best Stage Technician for his work as the master propertyman on Miss Liberty. To date, he is the only propertyman to have won a Tony Award.

Influence
In 1955, Ming Cho Lee was an unpaid assistant to Jo Mielziner. Cat on a Hot Tin Roof had a particularly tricky bar unit. Joe Lynn told him he would have to build it as they would never be able to find one to buy. Lee drew it so accurately that Lynn could build it directly from the drawing. Lynn told Mielziner, "This kid is OK. I can build from this drawing," which led to Lee's first paid job as a second assistant to Mielziner.

Broadway productions
 1936 Ethan Frome – National Theatre
 1936 White Horse Inn – Center Theatre
 1942 The Eve of St. Mark – Cort Theatre
 1943 A New Life – Royale Theatre
 1949 Death of Salesman – Morosco Theatre
 1949 Miss Liberty – Imperial Theatre – Tony Award
 1955 Cat on a Hot Tin Roof – Morosco Theatre
 1961 Under the Yum-Yum Tree – Henry Miller's Theatre
 1963 The Private Ear and The Public Eye – Morosco Theatre

References

External links 
 

American theatre people
Tony Award winners
Year of death missing